Breaking Up is a 1978 American TV film. It was directed by Delbert Mann and written by Loring Mandel.

Plot
A woman re-evaluates her life after her husband walks out on her following 15 years marriage.

Cast
Lee Remick as Joann Hammil
Granville Van Dusen as Tom Hammil
Vicky Dawson as Amy Hammil
David Stambaugh as T C Hammil
Fred J Scollay as Tony
Stephen Joyce as Gabe
Cynthia Harris as Edie
Michael Lombard as Ira
Meg Mundy as Louise Crawford
Ed Crowley as George
Linda Sorenson as Mickey
Kenneth Mcmillan as Vancrier

Reception
The Los Angeles Times called it "outstanding".

Tom and Joann
The film was adapted into a pilot Tom and Joann where the leads were played by Joel Fabiani and Elizabeth Ashley. The series did not result.

References

External links
Breaking Up at IMDb
Breaking Up at TCMDB
Tom and Joann at IMDb
Tom and Joann at TCMDB

1978 drama films
1978 television films
1978 films
American drama television films
Films directed by Delbert Mann
1970s American films
1970s English-language films